The Filibuster War or Walker affair was a military conflict between filibustering multinational troops stationed in Nicaragua and a coalition of Central American armies. An American mercenary William Walker invaded Nicaragua in 1855 with a small private army. He seized control of the country by 1856, but was ousted the following year.

Background 
Nicaragua’s independence from Spain, Mexico, and then from the United Provinces of Central America in 1838 did not free it from foreign interference.

The 1850s California Gold Rush created interest in the United States in finding a quicker route between the American east and west coasts. However, Great Britain had long been present on the coast of Nicaragua, which created tension between the two countries. The Clayton–Bulwer Treaty was signed in 1850, in which both sides "agreed that neither would claim exclusive power over a future canal in Central America nor gain exclusive control over any part of the region." Many Nicaraguans originally welcomed this treaty because of the potential financial benefits a canal could bring.

Following Nicaraguan independence from Spain, a conflict over power developed between the liberal party, based in León and the conservative party, based in Granada.

Initial stages
In 1854, a civil war erupted in Nicaragua between the Legitimist Party (also called the 'Conservative party'), and the Democratic Party (also called the 'Liberal party'). The liberal elite of León was losing the struggle to unseat the conservative elite of Granada and turned for help to a San Francisco-based soldier of fortune named William Walker. Walker was known as an adventurer who sought to take control of Latin American countries with the purpose of making them a part of the United States.

To circumvent American neutrality laws, Walker obtained a contract from Democratic president Francisco Castellón to bring as many as three hundred "colonists" to Nicaragua.  Walker sailed from San Francisco on May 3, 1855, with approximately 60 men.  Upon landing, the force was reinforced by 170 locals and about 100 Americans.

Establishment of Walker
[[File:Residence of Gen. William Walker, Granda cph.3a00914.jpg|thumb|right|200px|President Walker's house in Granada, Nicaragua. On October 12, 1856, during the siege of Granada, Guatemalan officer José Víctor Zavala ran under heavy fire to capture the Walker flag and bring it back to the Central American coalition army trenches shouting Filibuster bullets don't kill! Zavala survived this adventure unscathed.]]

With Castellón's consent, Walker attacked the Legitimists in the town of Rivas, near the trans-isthmian route. He was driven off, but not without inflicting heavy casualties. On September 4, during the Battle of La Virgen, Walker defeated the Legitimist army. On October 13, he conquered the Legitimist capital of Granada and took effective control of the country.  Initially, as commander of the army, Walker ruled Nicaragua through puppet President Patricio Rivas. U.S. President Franklin Pierce recognized Walker's regime as the legitimate government of Nicaragua on May 20, 1856.

Walker declared himself president, re-instituted slavery, and made English the official language.

Central American counterattack
Walker had scared his neighbors with talk of further military conquests in Central America. Juan Rafael Mora, President of Costa Rica, rejected Walker's diplomatic overtures and instead declared war on his regime.  Walker sent Colonel Schlessinger to invade Costa Rica in a preemptive action, but his forces were defeated at the Battle of Santa Rosa in March 1856. In April 1856, Costa Rican troops penetrated into Nicaraguan territory and inflicted a defeat on Walker's men at the Second Battle of Rivas, in which Juan Santamaría, later to be recognized as one of Costa Rica's national heroes, sacrificed himself to burn down the place where the Filibusters were staying. Walker set himself up as President of Nicaragua, after conducting an uncontested election. He was inaugurated on July 12, 1856, and soon launched an Americanization program, reinstating slavery, declaring English an official language and reorganizing currency and fiscal policy to encourage immigration from the United States of America.

Meanwhile, government representatives from Honduras, El Salvador and Guatemala signed in the City of Guatemala a Treaty of Alliance on July 18, 1856, for "defense of its sovereignty and independence" also recognized Patricio Rivas as president of Nicaragua. Costa Rica could not attend at that time to the alliance because of the havoc that cholera disease had caused in their troops, but would resume  actions later. Also, democratic and loyalist factions allied to Patricio Rivas, signed on 12 September, a "Providential Pact" declaring war against William Walker. For September 14, Septentrión Army (as the allied army was called) forces managed the first victory of the patriots Nicaraguans in the so-called Battle of San Jacinto.

By the end of 1856, Walker ordered the destruction of Granada.

The Costa Rican government resumed action in late 1856, and developed plans to take over the San Juan River in order to cut Walker's supply of weapons and new recruits. Cornelius Vanderbilt sent one of his agents, Sylvanus Spencer, to collaborate with the Costa Rican army in order to recover the possession of the Transit Company he had lost to Walker. Spencer arrives to San Jose in November 1856 and it is assigned to a company under Major Maximo Blanco to take over the steamers of the Transit Company. By January 1857, the Costa Rican army was in control of the San Juan River and all the steamers of the Transit Company.

Meanwhile, Walker was expelled from Granada by the rest of the allied armies. Some reinforcements under the command of Lockridge and Titus tried to recover the control of the River from the Costa Ricans, unsuccessfully. By April 1857, Walker had taken Rivas again, and the allies had laid siege to the city, in what became known as the Third Battle of Rivas.

Walker's surrender
 
Costa Rica, Honduras, and other Central American countries united to drive Walker out in 1857. During this time, Granada was burned and thousands of Central Americans lost their lives. The final battle of what Nicaraguans called the "National War" (1856–1857) took place in the spring of 1857 in the town of Rivas, near the Costa Rican border. Walker beat off the attacks, but the effort diminished the strength and morale of his forces and he soon succumbed.

The National War made for the cooperation between the Liberal and Conservative parties, which had brought Walker to Nicaragua. On May 1, 1857, Walker surrendered to Commander Charles Henry Davis of the United States Navy and was repatriated.  Upon disembarking in New York City, he was greeted as a hero, but he alienated public opinion when he blamed his defeat on the U.S. Navy.

Chronology

1855
 29 June: First Battle of Rivas, Nicaraguan troops of the legitimista band are victorious over Walker. 
 18 August: Battle of El Sauce, General José Trinidad Muñoz is killed, ending 18 years of de facto military rule in Nicaragua 
 30 August: Filibuster troops take the port of San Juan del Sur. The action by the teacher, Enmanuel Mongalo y Rubio, stands out.
 3 September: Battle of La Virgen, Walker defeats Jose Santos Guardiola's troops.
 13 October: Filibusters capture of the city of Granada with help from Nicaraguan troops of the democratico band.

1856
 20 March: Battle of Santa Rosa in Costa Rican territory.
 11 April: Second Battle of Rivas: Costa Rican troops repel the attack. The soldier, Juan Santamaría, stands out.
 26 April: Costa Rican troops leave Nicaragua, decimated by cholera.
 14 September: Victory of Nicaraguan patriots against the filibusters in the Battle of San Jacinto.
 22 September: William Walker decrees the legalization of slavery in the country.
 7 November: Costa Rican troops, under the command of José María Cañas, occupy San Juan del Sur.
 11 to 13 October: First Battle of Masaya: The Allied Central American Army repels the filibuster troops.
 11 November: Battle of the Transit: William Walker's troops defeat José María Cañas.
 15 to 17 November: Second Battle of Masaya, the Central American allies reject William Walker's troops.
 23 November: schooner Granada vs. brig Once de Abril. (See Action of 23 November 1856.)
 24 November to 14 December: destruction of Granada.
 16 December: Walker occupies the city of Rivas.
 December: Costa Rican troops began a series of attacks that take river steamers in San Juan del Norte and the river San Juan, as well as the fortresses of El Castillo and San Carlos.

1857
 3 January: Costa Rican troops take the steamer "San Carlos", isolating William Walker's government from the Atlantic Ocean.
 28 January: Allied troops occupy the lake port of San Jorge.
 5 March: Nicaraguan and Central American troops under the command of Fernando Chamorro Alfaro and Florencio Xatruch respectively, defeat the filibusters in the Battle of El Jocote.
 23 March: Third Battle of Rivas, Central American allies attack the town without results.
 11 April: Fourth Battle of Rivas, Central American allies, again, attack the town without results.
 17 April: Central American Allied troops occupy San Juan del Sur.
 1 May: William Walker surrenders to U.S. Captain Charles H. Davis.
 5 May: William Walker abandons Nicaragua in the sloop St. Mary's''.

References

External links
Map of North America and the Caribbean showing the Filibuster War at omniatlas.com

Conflicts in 1856
Conflicts in 1857
Military history of Costa Rica
1856 in Costa Rica
1857 in Costa Rica
Wars involving Costa Rica
History of Nicaragua
Wars involving Nicaragua
Civil wars involving the states and peoples of North America
Nicaragua–United States relations
Expansion of slavery in the United States